Sonja Vermeylen (born 17 April 1964) is a former Belgian racing cyclist. She won the Belgian national road race title in 1996 and 1997.

References

External links

1964 births
Living people
Belgian female cyclists
People from Vilvoorde
Cyclists from Flemish Brabant